Stohr is a German surname and it may refer to:

People
 Albert Stohr (1890–1961), German bishop
Carlos Stohr (1931-2017), Czech-born Venezuelan painter
 Donald J. Stohr (1934–2015), American federal judge
 Siegfried Stohr (born 1952), Italian racing driver

Other
 Stohr Cars, American racing cars manufacturer

See also
 Stöhr